Văgiulești is a commune in Gorj County, Oltenia, Romania. It is composed of five villages: Cârciu, Covrigi, Murgilești, Valea Motrului and Văgiulești.

References

Communes in Gorj County
Localities in Oltenia